William Henry Proctor (October 19, 1827March 12, 1902) was an American farmer and Republican politician.  He served one term in the Wisconsin State Assembly, representing Columbia County.

Biography

Born in Cavendish, Windsor County, Vermont, Proctor moved to Kalamazoo, Michigan in 1836. He then moved to Fountain Prairie, Wisconsin Territory, in 1844. Proctor was a farmer, and he inherited the farm in Fountain Prairie in 1855, when his mother died. He married Angeline Elizabeth Lashier (1838–1929) in 1857 and they had eight children together. He served on the Columbia County, Wisconsin Board of Supervisors and was involved in the Republican Party. In 1882, Proctor served in the Wisconsin State Assembly. Proctor died in Milwaukee, Wisconsin.

References

External links

1827 births
1902 deaths
People from Windsor County, Vermont
People from Fall River, Wisconsin
Farmers from Wisconsin
County supervisors in Wisconsin
Republican Party members of the Wisconsin State Assembly
19th-century American politicians